Donald Ellis Pickering (15 November 1933 – 19 December 2009) was an English actor, appearing in many stage, television, film and radio roles.

Early life and education
Pickering was born at Newcastle upon Tyne, son of John Joseph Pickering (died 1978) and Edith (died 1983), née Ellis. He was educated privately and at the Old Vic Theatre School in London established by Michel Saint-Denis.

Career
Pickering's television appearances include three roles in Doctor Who (The Keys of Marinus, 1964; The Faceless Ones, 1967; Time and the Rani, 1987). In the 26-part BBC series The Pallisers, he played Dolly Longstaffe. He also played roles in The House of Eliott, Dr. Watson in the series Sherlock Holmes and Doctor Watson (1979–1980), Yes, Prime Minister, The Brittas Empire, Executive Stress and The Professionals.

Filmography

References

External links

Obituary in The Independent

1933 births
2009 deaths
English male stage actors
English male film actors
English male television actors
Male actors from Newcastle upon Tyne